|}

The Fighting Fifth Hurdle is a Grade 1 National Hunt hurdle race in Great Britain which is open to horses aged four years or older. It is run at Newcastle over a distance of about 2 miles and half a furlong (2 miles and 46 yards, or 3,261 metres), and during its running there are nine hurdles to be jumped. The race is the first leg of the Triple Crown of Hurdling scheduled to take place each year in late November or early December.

History
The event was established in 1969, and the inaugural running was won by Mugatpura. Its title refers to the "Fighting Fifth", the nickname of the Royal Northumberland Fusiliers. In the year prior to the race's launch, the regiment (formerly known as the 5th Regiment of Foot) was amalgamated with three others to form the Royal Regiment of Fusiliers.

There were two triple winners of the Fighting Fifth Hurdle during the 1970s: Comedy of Errors and Bird's Nest. The latter also finished first in 1980 but after a stewards' inquiry he was relegated to second place behind Sea Pigeon.

The Fighting Fifth Hurdle was formerly classed at Grade 2 level, and for a brief spell in the 1990s it was run as a limited handicap. Its past sponsors have included Bellway Homes, Newcastle Building Society and Pertemps and the race has been sponsored  by Betfair since 2019. It was promoted to Grade 1 status in 2004, and it is now the first top-grade hurdle race of the British National Hunt season.

Records
Most successful horse (3 wins):
 Comedy of Errors – 1972, 1973, 1974
 Birds Nest – 1976, 1977, 1979

Leading jockey (3 wins):
 Barry Geraghty - Punjabi (2008), Buveur d'Air (2017, 2018)

Leading trainer (8 wins):
 Nicky Henderson - Landing Light (2001), Punjabi (2008), My Tent Or Yours (2013), Buveur d'Air (2017, 2018), Epatante (2020, 2021 (2021 a dead heat)), Constitution Hill (2022)

Winners

See also
 Horse racing in Great Britain
 List of British National Hunt races

References

 Racing Post:
 , 

 pedigreequery.com – Fighting Fifth Hurdle – Newcastle.

External links
 Race Recordings 

National Hunt races in Great Britain
Newcastle Racecourse
National Hunt hurdle races
Recurring sporting events established in 1969
1969 establishments in England